Demir Atasoy (also Dmitry Cherkasov, born May 26, 1987 in Dnipropetrovsk, Ukrainian SSR) is a Ukrainian-born Turkish swimmer, who specialized in the breaststroke events. Laureate of the National Rating «Top 100 Outstanding Men of Kyiv Region».

Atasoy qualified for the men's 100 m breaststroke at the 2008 Summer Olympics in Beijing, by clearing a FINA B-standard time of 1:02.43 from the Croatian Open Championships in Dubrovnik. He challenged seven other swimmers on the fourth heat, including three-time Olympian Jakob Jóhann Sveinsson of Iceland. Atasoy edged out Serbia's Čaba Silađi to take the second spot by six hundredths of a second (0.06), posting his lifetime best of 1:02.25. Atasoy failed to advance into the semifinals, as he placed thirty-ninth overall on the first night of preliminaries.

At the 2013 Mediterranean Games held in Mersin, Turkey, he won the bronze medal in the men's 4 × 100 m medley relay.

He won four gold medals and one silver medal at the 2013 Islamic Solidarity Games held in Palembang, Indonesia.

Achievements

References

External links
NBC Olympics Profile
Dmytro Cherkasov Family Photoshoot

1987 births
Living people
Ukrainian male swimmers
Olympic swimmers of Turkey
Swimmers at the 2008 Summer Olympics
Turkish male breaststroke swimmers
Fenerbahçe swimmers
Mediterranean Games bronze medalists for Turkey
Swimmers at the 2013 Mediterranean Games
Mediterranean Games medalists in swimming
Islamic Solidarity Games medalists in swimming
Islamic Solidarity Games competitors for Turkey
Sportspeople from Dnipro